Erica recurvata is a critically endangered South African species of Cape heath first known from a botanical painting by Henry Cranke Andrews in the late 1700s. The species was rediscovered after some 200 years when it was found flowering near Napier in 2007. It belongs to the small Oxyloma section of Ericas, all three the members having strongly exserted styles, and included anthers.

Erica recurvata is a shrub of some 30 cm to 60 cm in height. It has dense whorls of small needle-like leaves which are pale green to grey-green in colour, and recurving in habit, whence the specific name. Clusters of sticky, pendulous flowers appear in winter, having white sepals, dark brown to almost black corollas, and with long, red, exserted styles.

Its distribution is limited to a small area in rocky, mountainous terrain on the Overberg where it grows in crevices between sandstone boulders.

References

recurvata
Taxa named by Henry Cranke Andrews